The Gouden Strop (i.e. 'Golden Noose') is the annual award for the best crime novel in the Dutch language. The prize has been awarded since 1986. The winner receives € 10,000 and a statuette. Its Belgian equivalent is the Diamanten Kogel (i.e. 'Diamond Bullet').

List of winners
 2013: Nacht in Parijs Michael Berg
 2012: Een zomer zonder slaap Bram Dehouck
 2011: De handen van Kalman Teller Gauke Andriesse
 2010: De minzame moordenaar Bram Dehouck 
 2009:  Daglicht Marion Pauw
 2008 : Cel Charles den Tex
 2007 : De tiende vrouw Roel Janssen
 2006 : De macht van meneer Miller Charles den Tex
 2005 : Dood van een soldaat Johanna Spaey
 2004 : Groene vrijdag Elvin Post
 2003 : De zesde mei Tomas Ross
 2002 : Schijn van kans Charles den Tex
 2001 : Zinloos geweld René Appel
 2000 : Het Alibibureau Peter de Zwaan
 1999 : Cleopatra Felix Thijssen
 1998 : Fotofinish Jac. Toes
 1997 : De kracht van het vuur Bob Mendes
 1996 : Koerier voor Sarajevo Tomas Ross
 1995 : Vertraging Tim Krabbé
 1994 : Het woeden der gehele wereld Maarten 't Hart
 1993 : Vergelding Bob Mendes
 1992 : Playback Chris Rippen
 1991 : De derde persoon René Appel
 1990 : not awarded
 1989 : De terugkeer van Sid Stefan Gerben Hellinga
 1988 : not awarded
 1987 : Bèta Tomas Ross
 1986 : De zaak Alzheimer Jef Geeraerts

External links
 

Dutch literary awards
Awards established in 1986
Mystery and detective fiction awards
1986 establishments in the Netherlands